The Muppets on Puppets is a 1970 TV special created by Jim Henson. The special was produced in June 1968 at public television station WITF-TV in Hershey, Pennsylvania, for National Educational Television (now PBS). It aired on New York's WNET on January 5, 1970, as part of the station's Adventure in the Arts anthology series. Henson and company made three additional specials in color as part of the series at WITF-TV. The special is included as a bonus feature on the DVD set The Muppet Show: Season Three. This release includes a few audio drop-outs due to the video source.

Plot

Jim Henson and Rowlf the Dog explain the arts of puppet building and puppeteering as well as describing the different type of puppets used in his performances.

Cast
 Jim Henson - Himself
 Jerry Juhl - Himself
 Frank Oz - Himself
 Don Sahlin - Himself

Muppet performers
 Jim Henson - Kermit the Frog, Rowlf the Dog, King Fred, King Goshposh, Rock and Roll Monster (Middle Head), Southern Colonel, Wontkins
 Frank Oz - Beautiful Day Monster, Gretel the Cow, Little Girl Sue, Princess Gwendolynda, Right Hand of Southern Colonel, Rock and Roll Monster (Right Head), Splurge
 Jerry Juhl - Charlie, Grump, Hansel, Henrietta, Rock and Roll Monster (Left Head), Scritch the Witch, Taminella Grinderfall

Credits
 Writer: Jerry Juhl
 Host: Jim Henson
 Puppeteers: Frank Oz, and Jim Henson, Jerry Juhl
 Puppet builder: Donald Sahlin
 Piano Music: Dennis Stoner
 Historical Puppets Courtesy Of: Bil Baird and Milton Hapert
 Settings: Charles Rice
 Lighting: Bill Coss
 Technical Supervision: Larry Winemiller, John Bosak
 Producer and Director: Tim Steele

External links
 
 The Muppets on Puppets at Muppet Wiki

1970 television specials
The Muppets television specials